The men's regu sepak takraw competition at the 2014 Asian Games in Incheon was held from 29 September to 3 October at the Bucheon Gymnasium.

Squads

Results 
All times are Korea Standard Time (UTC+09:00)

Preliminary

Group A

|-
|29 September||09:00
|align=right|
|align=center|0–2
|align=left|
|20–22||15–21||
|-
|29 September||09:00
|align=right|
|align=center|1–2
|align=left|
|21–8||14–21||19–21
|-
|29 September||14:00
|align=right|
|align=center|2–0
|align=left|
|21–11||21–13||
|-
|29 September||14:00
|align=right|
|align=center|2–1
|align=left|
|6–21||21–16||21–19
|-
|30 September||09:00
|align=right|
|align=center|0–2
|align=left|
|19–21||8–21||
|-
|30 September||09:00
|align=right|
|align=center|2–0
|align=left|
|21–13||21–10||
|-
|30 September||14:00
|align=right|
|align=center|2–0
|align=left|
|21–16||21–4||
|-
|30 September||14:00
|align=right|
|align=center|1–2
|align=left|
|15–21||21–19||17–21
|-
|1 October||09:00
|align=right|
|align=center|2–0
|align=left|
|21–15||22–20||
|-
|1 October||09:00
|align=right|
|align=center|2–0
|align=left|
|21–8||21–7||
|-

Group B

|-
|29 September||11:00
|align=right|
|align=center|0–2
|align=left|
|colspan=3|Walkover
|-
|29 September||11:00
|align=right|
|align=center|2–0
|align=left|
|21–12||21–15||
|-
|29 September||16:00
|align=right|
|align=center|0–2
|align=left|
|colspan=3|Walkover
|-
|29 September||16:00
|align=right|
|align=center|1–2
|align=left|
|21–14||16–21||10–21
|-
|30 September||11:00
|align=right|
|align=center|2–0
|align=left|
|21–18||21–10||
|-
|30 September||11:00
|align=right|
|align=center|0–2
|align=left|
|13–21||6–21||
|-
|30 September||16:00
|align=right|
|align=center|0–2
|align=left|
|colspan=3|Walkover
|-
|30 September||16:00
|align=right|
|align=center|2–0
|align=left|
|24–22||21–18||
|-
|1 October||11:00
|align=right|
|align=center|2–0
|align=left|
|colspan=3|Walkover
|-
|1 October||11:00
|align=right|
|align=center|0–2
|align=left|
|16–21||15–21||
|-

Knockout round

Semifinals

|-
|2 October||09:00
|align=right|
|align=center|2–0
|align=left|
|21–9||21–8||
|-
|2 October||11:00
|align=right|
|align=center|2–1
|align=left|
|21–11||17–21||21–16
|-

Gold medal match

|-
|3 October||11:30
|align=right|
|align=center|2–0
|align=left|
|21–16||21–14||
|-

References

External links
 Official website

Sepak takraw at the 2014 Asian Games